Barron Winchester (September 15, 1932 – February 9, 2002) was an American film and stage actor, possibly best known for his role as Eric Stem in the 1979 cult film Delirium.

Biography
Barron Winchester was born Duane Lee Jones on September 15, 1932. He was a former sergeant in the US Marine Corps and a Korean war veteran.

He had to change his stage name to that of Barron Winchester because the Screen Actors Guild already had the name Duane Jones registered.

Winchester acted on stage and film from around the 1960s until the early 1980s. Later on, he also did work behind the scenes in films such as Cover Story, The Big Brass Ring, starring William Hurt and Sir Nigel Hawthorne. and Gua Sha.

His wife, Theresa Meyer Jones, was the Hermann Area District Hospital's first director of nursing service. At Saint Louis University she was clinical instructor from 1975 to 1978. Also for the last 23 years of her nursing career she worked in the St. Anthony's Medical Center emergency room. The couple was married for 32 years, from 1970 to 2002.

In 1979 he played the part of the obsessed vigilante Eric Stem in cult film Delirium which was directed and produced by Peter Maris who also directed Ministry of Vengeance and Zombie Hunters.

On February 2, 2002, Winchester suffered a heart attack and was admitted to St. Anthony's Medical Center in St. Louis County. He died seven days later, at age 69. and was buried at Jefferson Barracks National Cemetery. Theresa Jones died on January 25, 2008.

Film work
 1979 – A Pleasure Doing Business
 1979 – Delirium
 1981 – Escape from New York
 1993 – Cover Story (firearms master)  
 1999 – The Big Brass Ring (Special effects; makeup assistant)
 2001 –  Gua Sha (special effects) 
 2010 –  Video Nasties: Moral Panic, Censorship & Videotape (video documentary as himself)

Other works

Dramatic work and accompanying music
 1984 – Delta Recon – an original one-act play / by Duane Jones
 1985 – Goode's Tattos – a one-character, one-act, one-set play / by Duane Jones.
 1990 – A Highway of Innocents – a one-act play / by Barron Winchester
 1991 – Goodes Tattoos – a one-act play

References

American male film actors
American male stage actors
1932 births
2002 deaths
20th-century American male actors